The de Havilland DH.85 Leopard Moth is a three-seat high-wing cabin monoplane designed and built by the de Havilland Aircraft Company in 1933.

Design and construction
It was a successor to the DH.80 Puss Moth and replaced it on the company's Stag Lane and later Hatfield production lines. It was similar in configuration to the earlier aircraft, but instead of a fuselage with tubular steel framework, a lighter all-plywood structure was used which allowed a substantial improvement in range, performance and capacity on the same type of engine.  The pilot is seated centrally in front of two side-by-side passengers and the wings can be folded for hangarage.

Operational history
The prototype first flew on 27 May 1933 and in July won the King's Cup Race at an average speed of 139.5 mph (224.5 km/h), piloted by Geoffrey de Havilland. A total of 133 aircraft were built, including 71 for owners in the British Isles, and 10 for Australia. Other examples were exported to France, Germany, India, South Africa and Switzerland. Production of the Leopard Moth ended in 1936.

44 Leopard Moths were impressed into military service in Britain and others in Australia during World War II, mostly as communications aircraft. Only a few managed to survive six years of hard usage although a small number were still airworthy seventy years after the last was completed. Six remained operational in the U.K. in 2009.

Operators

Military operators

Aviation militaire de la Force publique First aircraft (C-1) entered service 9 October 1940.

Luftwaffe (small numbers)

Royal Indian Air Force

Dutch Army Aviation Group

Portuguese Air Force

South African Air Force

Southern Rhodesian Air Force operated one aircraft only.

Spanish Air Force

Malayan Volunteer Air Force

Royal Air Force impressed into service a number of former civil aircraft, using them as communications and liaison aircraft during the Second World War.
Royal Navy impressed into service at least one former civil aircraft.

Royal Yugoslav Air Force operated one aircraft only.

Airline operators

Air India

Specifications (DH.85)

See also

References

Bibliography

High-wing aircraft
Single-engined tractor aircraft
1930s British civil utility aircraft
Leopard Moth
Aircraft first flown in 1933